
Gmina Aleksandrów Kujawski is a rural gmina (administrative district) in Aleksandrów County, Kuyavian-Pomeranian Voivodeship, in north-central Poland. Its seat is the town of Aleksandrów Kujawski, although the town is not part of the territory of the gmina.

Villages
Gmina Aleksandrów Kujawski contains the villages of Białe Błota, Chrusty, Goszczewo, Grabie, Konradowo, Kuczek, Łazieniec, Nowa Wieś, Nowy Ciechocinek, Odolion, Opoczki, Opoki, Ośno, Ośno-Parcele, Ostrowąs, Otłoczyn, Otłoczynek, Pinino, Plebanka, Poczałkowo, Poczałkowo-Kolonia, Podgaj, Przybranówek, Przybranowo, Rudunki, Słomkowo, Słońsk Dolny, Służewo, Stara Wieś, Stare Rożno, Stawki, Wilkostowo, Wólka, Wołuszewo, Wygoda, Zduny and Zgoda.

Neighbouring gminas
Gmina Aleksandrów Kujawski is bordered by the towns of Aleksandrów Kujawski and Ciechocinek, and by the gminas of Dąbrowa Biskupia, Gniewkowo, Koneck, Obrowo, Raciążek and Wielka Nieszawka.

References
 Polish official population figures 2006

Aleksandrow Kujawski
Aleksandrów County